Andrzej Świerczyński (born 25 October 1952) is a Polish sprinter. He competed in the men's 100 metres at the 1976 Summer Olympics. He is married to Polish Olympic athlete Bożena Nowakowska.

References

1952 births
Living people
Athletes (track and field) at the 1976 Summer Olympics
Polish male sprinters
Olympic athletes of Poland
Athletes from Warsaw